Ludovic Saline (born 23 March 1989) is a French professional footballer who plays as a midfielder for Championnat National 2 club Beauvais.

Career

During a spell in Italian football between 2010 and 2011, Saline played five matches in the Lega Pro for Pisa. In july 2018, he joined Belfort.

Career statistics

References

External links
 Ludovic Saline at foot-national.com

1989 births
Living people
Sportspeople from Saint-Denis, Seine-Saint-Denis
French footballers
French expatriate footballers
Expatriate footballers in Italy
Association football midfielders
US Torcy players
FC Lorient players
US Concarneau players
Pisa S.C. players
AS Moulins players
Lyon La Duchère players
FC Chambly Oise players
SC Schiltigheim players
ASM Belfort players
AS Beauvais Oise players
Serie C players
Championnat National players
Championnat National 2 players
Footballers from Seine-Saint-Denis